Butler Center is an unincorporated community in Butler Township, DeKalb County, Indiana.

Butler Center is situated at the geographical center of Butler Township, hence the name.

Geography

References

Unincorporated communities in DeKalb County, Indiana
Unincorporated communities in Indiana